Rajya Sabha election in Tamil Nadu was the indirect election to the Rajya Sabha which is the upper house of the Parliament of India to elect members from the Indian state of Tamil Nadu. The election were held for six seats on 27 June 2013. The elections for which voting was held for the first time in 17 years.

Background 
The term of six members of Rajya Sabha from Tamil Nadu expired on 27 July. Hence, the Election Commission of India decided to hold a biennial election for the six seats. The candidates were indirectly elected by the Members of the Legislative Assembly (MLAs) of Tamil Nadu using a single transferable vote with proportional representation.

Party Position in the State assembly 

 7 dissident MLAs of DMDK are supporting AIADMK

Candidates 
Each candidate should have 34 number of MLAs. Therefore, the party which has 34 MLAs can elect one member. The party which has less than 34 MLAs can get support from other parties.

Results 
The results to the election were declared on June 27.

Three MLAs of PMK boycotted the elections.

References 

Elections in Tamil Nadu
2010s in Tamil Nadu
Tamil Nadu
2013 elections in India